Biskit is an open source software package that facilitates research in structural bioinformatics and molecular modelling. Written in Python, it consists of:

 An object-oriented programming library for manipulating and analyzing macromolecular structures, protein complexes and molecular dynamics trajectories
 A set of programs for solving specific tasks, such as automatic prediction of protein structures by homology modeling, and possible prediction of protein complex structures through flexible protein-protein docking

The library delegates many calculations to more specialized third-party software. It currently utilizes 15 external applications, including X-PLOR, Hex, T-Coffee, DSSP and MODELLER.

The latest Biskit version, 2.4.0, was released on 4 Mar 2012.  It was originally developed at the Pasteur Institute. The name "Biskit" refers to the research group's name, Unité de BioInformatique Structurale.

External links 
 

Structural bioinformatics software
Molecular modelling
Physics software
Computational chemistry software
Free science software
Free software programmed in Python
Molecular dynamics